Swift, Certain, and Fair (SCF) is an approach to criminal-justice supervision involving probation, parole, pre-trial diversion, and/or incarceration.

Features

SCF implementations typically have the following features:
 Limited set of rules
 Clear warnings
 Close monitoring
 Swift response to violations
 A modest consequence for every violation

HOPE

One of the first SCF programs was Hawaii's Opportunity Probation with Enforcement (HOPE), created in Honolulu in 2004 by Judge Steven Alm.

In 2009 the program was evaluated by Angela Hawken and Mark Kleiman. They found that, compared with probationers supervised as usual, HOPE probationers were: 
 55% less likely to be arrested for a new crime
 72% less likely to use drugs
 61% less likely to skip appointments with their supervisory officer
 53% less likely to have their probation revoked.

Demonstration Field Experiment (DFE)

To assess the universality of the Hawaii results, the Bureau of Justice Assistance and National Institute of Justice funded a replication and randomized control trial at four mainland sites. Findings were expected by 2016.

Other implementations

SCF programs have been implemented in at least 28 states and an American Indian nation.

References

Other sources
 
 
 
 Pepperdine and Department of Justice Announce Swift Certain Fair Resource Center

Law enforcement in the United States